Una Navidad con Gilberto (A Christmas with Gilberto), is the title of a Christmas album released by Puerto-Rican singer Gilberto Santa Rosa on October 14, 2008 by Sony BMG Norte. It was the first time that Gilberto released his own Christmas album. He previous collaborated with various artists on the Tarjeta de Navidad by Sony Discos. In addition, he collaborated with Puerto Rican salsa group El Gran Combo de Puerto Rico on their album, Asi es Nuestra Navidad. The album peaked at number-six in the Billboard Top Latin Albums chart and number twenty-two on the Billboard Holiday Albums chart. It remained on the Top Latin Album charts for thirteen weeks. The album reached number-one on the Tropical Albums where it spent three weeks on the spot. At the Latin Grammy Awards of 2009, the album received a Latin Grammy Award for "Best Traditional Tropical Album".

The backup vocals includes Henry Santiago, Michelle Sotomayor, the producer Charlie Donato, Jerry Rivas of El Gran Combo de Puerto Rico, and Gilberto's protégé Víctor Manuelle. The latter composed the last track for the album, "La Navidad Más Larga". Dominican Republic singer appears as a guest on the medley, "Cascabel y Candela".

Two songs from the album were released as singles. The first single, "Me Gustan Las Navidades" ("I Enjoy the Holidays"), reached number-nine on the Billboard Latin Tropical Airplay chart. The second single, "La Fiesta No Es Para Feos" ("The Party Is Not For Ugly People"), reached number-seven on the Billboard Latin Tropical Airplay chart.

Track listing

Charts

Weekly charts

Year-end charts

See also
List of number-one Billboard Tropical Albums from the 2000s

References

2008 Christmas albums
Christmas albums by Puerto Rican artists
Gilberto Santa Rosa albums
Sony Music Latin albums
Spanish-language albums